Glycine receptor subunit alpha-1 is a protein that in humans is encoded by the GLRA1 gene.

Function 
The inhibitory glycine receptor mediates postsynaptic inhibition in the spinal cord and other regions of the central nervous system. It is a pentameric receptor composed solely of alpha subunits. The GLRB gene encodes the alpha subunit of the receptor.

Clinical significance 
Mutations in the gene have been associated with hyperekplexia, a neurologic syndrome associated with an exaggerated startle reaction.

See also
 Glycine receptor
 Stiff person syndrome
 Hyperekplexia

References

Further reading

External links 
 

Ion channels